Pokémon the Series: Sun & Moon is the twentieth season of the Pokémon animated series and the first and titular season of Pokémon the Series: Sun & Moon, known in Japan as . This season follows the adventures of Ash Ketchum and Pikachu as they travel to the Alola region, go to Pokémon school with classmates Lillie, Lana, Mallow, Kiawe, Sophocles, participate in the island trials, and learn how to use the power of Z-moves. This season is a good jump off point. The season originally aired in Japan from November 17, 2016, to September 21, 2017, on TV Tokyo, and in the United States from May 12, 2017, to December 9, 2017, on Disney XD, making it the first Pokémon series to premiere on that channel. Prior to this, a preview of the first two episodes aired on the network on December 5, 2016.

The ending song is "Pose" (ポーズ, Pōzu) by Taiiku Okazaki, and the English opening song is "Under the Alolan Sun" by Jannel Candrice and The Sad Truth, featuring composer Ed Goldfarb. Its instrumental version serves as the ending theme.



Episode list

Home media releases 
Viz Media and Warner Home Video released the entire series on a single 6-disc boxset on DVD in the United States on May 21, 2019.

Notes

References 

2016 Japanese television seasons
2017 Japanese television seasons
Season20